The National Traffic Police (Mishteret Tnu'a Artzit, abbr. Matna) is the main Israeli traffic law enforcement unit. It was founded in September 1991 and in 1997 subordinated to the newly created Traffic Department of the Israel Police.

Units
The National Traffic Police is divided into five regional units and a national patrol unit. The regional units are:
Northern District Traffic Police
Central District Traffic Police
Tel Aviv District Traffic Police
Jerusalem District Traffic Police
Southern District Traffic Police

References

See also
 Highway patrol

Israel Police